R.A.I.D, an abbreviation for Rueban and the Imperium Division, is an Indian crossover thrash band that originated out of Hyderabad, India. The band began in 2016, simply known as Rueban.

History
The band would form in 2013 out of Hyderabad, India, known simply as Rueban. The band originally was a solo project for Vocalist Rueban Issac that he created to work on music between working with his other bands, Onslaught and In Heaven's Eyes. The project recorded an album, titled Indestructible, which was set to release in 2013. In 2016, Rueban would also release a second album, Stronger Than Ever. However, after the two releases, he decided to make the band a full lineup, which led to him putting an ad out for local musicians. Soon thereafter, the band became a six-piece band, consisting of Issac, Abishek Allapanda on guitars, Emmanuel Ojo on guitars, Shawn Vivian on guitars, Stephen Rahul on bass, and Bobbin Jaydev on drums. Rahul and Vivian departed from the band before recording any material, with Ojo taking up bass as well. With this new lineup, the band decided to change the name to R.A.I.D..

The band signed with Rottweiler Records, a record label based out of Fort Wayne, Indiana. Once the band signed with the label, they recorded and released their debut album as R.A.I.D., titled The Strong Survive. Following the band's release of The Strong Survive, Ojo seemingly departed from the band, with the replacement of Sam Jaba taking on Bass. The band would begin to work on their sophomore release, releasing a few singles as EPs, including Unbreakable and Outrage. The album was based around the story of Samson from the Bible. The band released their sophomore album, titled Imperium through Rottweiler Records in 2019. The band released their third studio album titled Defiance through Rottweiler Records in 2022. The album has received critical acclaim, and is considered to be the band's best offering to date.

Style and influence
The band has consistently been compared to bands such as Madball and Agnostic Front. The band lists Madball, Agnostic Front, Suicidal Tendencies, Terror, Snapcase, and Hatebreed as influences.

Members
Current
Rueban Issac - vocals (2016-present)
Abishek Allapanda - guitars (2016-present)
Sam Jaba - bass (2018-present)
Bobbin Jaydev - drums (2016-present)

Former
Emmanuel Ojo - guitars (2016-2018), bass (2017-2018)
Shawn Vivian - guitars (2016-2017)
Stephen Rahul - bass (2016-2017)

Discography
Studio albums
The Strong Survive (2018)
Imperium (2019)
Defiance (2022)

D45s
Unbreakeable (2019)
Outrage (2019)

Singles
"Detonate" (2016)
"Soul of a Lion" (2018)
"Outrage" (2019)
"Unbreakeable" (2019)
"Blind" (2019)
"Alpha" (2022)
"Shattered Beliefs" (2022)

References

External links
R.A.I.D. on Bandcamp

Christian metal musical groups
Christian hardcore musical groups
Indian hardcore punk groups
Thrash metal musical groups
Musical groups established in 2013
Rottweiler Records artists
2013 establishments in Andhra Pradesh